The 1957 NBA draft was the 11th annual draft of the National Basketball Association (NBA). The draft was held on April 17, 1957, before the 1957–58 season. In this draft, eight NBA teams took turns selecting amateur U.S. college basketball players. Prior to the draft, the Fort Wayne Pistons and the Rochester Royals relocated to Detroit and Cincinnati, and became the Detroit Pistons and the Cincinnati Royals respectively. In each round, the teams select in reverse order of their win–loss record in the previous season. The draft consisted of 14 rounds comprising 83 players selected.

Draft selections and draftee career notes
Rod Hundley from West Virginia University was selected first overall by the Cincinnati Royals. However, the Royals immediately traded his draft rights to the Minneapolis Lakers. Eight pick of the draft, Sam Jones from North Carolina Central University, have been inducted to the Basketball Hall of Fame. Woody Sauldsberry, who was selected in the eighth round, went on to win the Rookie of the Year Award in his first season. He would be the highest selected rookie to ever win the award in league history, being selected as the 60th pick in the NBA that year. Jim Brown from Syracuse University was selected in the ninth round by the Syracuse Nationals, but he opted for a professional football career and eventually playing nine successful seasons in the National Football League (NFL). Brown was later inducted to the Pro Football Hall of Fame and is considered one of the greatest professional football players ever.

Key

Draft

Other picks 
The following list includes other draft picks who have appeared in at least one NBA game.

Trades 
 On draft-day, the Minneapolis Lakers acquired the draft rights to first pick Rod Hundley along with Bob Burrow, Ed Fleming, Don Meineke and Art Spoelstra from the Cincinnati Royals in exchange for Clyde Lovellette and Jim Paxson.
 Prior to the draft, the New York Knicks acquired the Detroit Pistons' first-round pick, which was used to select Charlie Tyra, along with Mel Hutchins from the Pistons in exchange for Dick Atha, Nathaniel Clifton and Harry Gallatin.

See also
 List of first overall NBA draft picks

References 
General

Specific

External links
NBA.com
NBA.com: NBA Draft History

Draft
National Basketball Association draft
NBA draft
NBA draft
1950s in St. Louis
Basketball in St. Louis
Events in St. Louis